The International Conference on Information Systems Security and Privacy – ICISSP – aims to create a meeting point for practitioners and researchers interested in security and privacy challenges that concern information systems covering technological and social issues.

The format of the conference counts on technical sessions, poster sessions, tutorials, doctoral consortiums, panels, industrial tracks and keynote lectures. The papers presented in the conference are made available at the SCITEPRESS digital library, published in the conference proceedings and some of the best papers are invited to a post-publication with Springer, in a CCIS Series book.

ICISSP also counts on keynote talks. Some of the invited speakers announced in the previous editions of the conference were: Ross J. Anderson (University of Cambridge, UK), Elisa Bertino (Purdue University, USA), Bart Preneel (KU Leuven, Belgium), Jason Hong (Carnegie Mellon University, USA) and Steven Furnell (University of Plymouth, UK).

Conference topics

 Access and Usage Control
 Risk and Reputation Management
 Security and Privacy in Cloud and Pervasive Computing
 Authentication, Privacy and Security Models
 Security Architecture and Design Analysis
 Security Awareness and Education
 Security Frameworks, Architectures and Protocols
 Security Testing
 Software Security Assurance
 Threat Awareness
 Vulnerability Analysis and Countermeasures
 Information Hiding and Anonymity
 Web Applications and Services
 Biometric Technologies and Applications
 Content Protection and Digital Rights Management
 Cryptographic Algorithms
 Data and Software Security
 Data Mining and Knowledge Discovery
 Database Security
 Identity and Trust management  
 Trusted Computing
 Intrusion Detection and Response
 Legal and Regulatory Issues
 Malware Detection
 Mobile Systems Security
 Privacy Metrics and Control
 Privacy, Security and Trust in Social Media
 Privacy-Enhancing Models and Technologies
 Security in IoT and Edge Computing
 Distributed Ledgers and Blockchain Technologies and Applications
 AI and Machine Learning for Security

Editions and proceedings

ICISSP 2020 – Valletta, Malta
Proceedings of the 6th International Conference on Information Systems Security and Privacy.

ICISSP 2019 – Prague, Czech Republic
Proceedings of the 5th International Conference on Information Systems Security and Privacy.  

Best Paper Award – Dayana Spagnuelo, Ana Ferreira and Gabriele Lenzini, “Accomplishing Transparency within the General Data Protection Regulation” 

Best Student Paper Award - Maja Nyman and Christine Große, “Are You Ready When It Counts? IT Consulting Firm’s Information Security Incident Management”

ICISSP 2018 – Funchal, Madeira, Portugal
Proceedings of the 4th International Conference on Information Systems Security and Privacy.  

Best Paper Award – Wei-Han Lee, Jorge Ortiz, Bongjun Ko and Ruby Lee, “Inferring Smartphone Users’ Handwritten Patterns by using Motion Sensors” 

Best Student Paper Award - Vincent Haupert and Tilo Müller, “On App-based Matrix Code Authentication in Online Banking”

ICISSP 2017 – Porto, Portugal
Proceedings of the 3rd International Conference on Information Systems Security and Privacy.  

Best Paper Award – Lake Bu and Mark G. Karpovsky, “A Design of Secure and ReliableWireless Transmission Channel for Implantable Medical Devices” 

Best Student Paper Award - Iman Sedeeq, Frans Coenen and Alexei Lisitsa, “Attribute Permutation Steganography Detection using Attribute Position Changes Count”

ICISSP 2016 – Rome, Italy
Proceedings of the 2nd International Conference on Information Systems Security and Privacy.  

Best Paper Award – Christoph Kerschbaumer, Sid Stamm and Stefan Brunthaler. “Injecting CSP for Fun and Security” 

Best Student Paper Award - Kexin Qiao, Lei Hu and Siwei Sun, “Differential Security Evaluation of Simeck with Dynamic Key-guessing Techniques”

ICISSP 2015 – ESEO, Angers, Loire Valley, France
Proceedings of the 1st International Conference on Information Systems Security and Privacy .  

Best Paper Award - Fabian Knirsch, Dominik Engel, Christian Neureiter, Marc Frincu and Viktor Prasanna. "Model-driven Privacy Assessment in the Smart Grid"

Best Student Paper Award - Carsten Büttner and Sorin A. Huss. "A Novel Anonymous Authenticated Key Agreement Protocol for Vehicular Ad Hoc Networks"

References

External links
 Conference website
  ICISSP Publications
 WikiCfp call for papers

Information systems conferences
Computer science conferences
Academic conferences